The Thin Man Goes Home is a 1945 comedy-mystery film directed by Richard Thorpe. It is the fifth of the six Thin Man films starring William Powell and Myrna Loy as Dashiell Hammett's dapper ex-private detective Nick Charles and his wife Nora. This entry in The Thin Man series was the first not directed by W.S. Van Dyke, who had died in 1943.

Plot
Nick and Nora visit Nick's parents in Nick's hometown, Sycamore Springs, in New England. The residents are convinced that Nick is in town on an investigation, despite Nick's repeated denials. However, when aircraft factory employee Peter Berton seeks out Nick and is shot dead before he can reveal anything, Nick is on the case.

An old childhood friend, Dr. Bruce Clayworth, performs the autopsy and extracts a pistol bullet. When Nick searches Berton's room for clues, he is knocked unconscious by Crazy Mary, a local eccentric. 
 
Nora's innocent purchase of a painting for Nick's birthday present turns out to be the key to the mystery. When she shows it to her husband, it brings back unpleasant memories for him, so she donates it to a charity bazaar. When Edgar Draque offers Nora a large sum for the painting, Nick wonders why it is so valuable. Nick learns that Draque's wife Helena bought the artwork, but she is knocked out and the painting disappears. Nick discovers that Crazy Mary is Berton's mother and goes to see her, only to come across her lifeless body. Nick and Nora's dog Asta finds the painting in her shack.

Nick puts the pieces together and has the police bring all the suspects to his father's house. Early on, it is revealed that Nick's father, Dr. Bertram Charles, has never been overly impressed with his son's unusual career choice, so this allows Nick to change his father's mind. Using Dr. Charles's fluoroscope, Nick shows that there is a blueprint hidden underneath the paint. Several people identify it as part of the specifications for a new aircraft propeller worth a great deal to a "foreign power". Berton had copied the blueprints and concealed the copies under five paintings. He had a change of heart and was going to confess all to Nick, but was killed by the spies he was dealing with. Nick has a souvenir World War II Japanese Nambu sniper rifle belonging to Dr. Clayworth's brother brought in and claims it was the murder weapon. Then, after proving that the Draques are members of the spy ring, Nick reveals the identity of its leader: Dr. Bruce Clayworth. Clayworth's first slip was the bullet he showed Nick. Nick knew a handgun bullet would not have the power to penetrate as far into Berton's body as the real one went. Clayworth grabs the rifle. He confesses to the murder, and also to a deep hatred for Nick for always being better than him in their youth. He tries to shoot his nemesis, only to find that Nick had taken the precaution of removing the firing pin. Nick's father is very impressed.

Cast
 William Powell as Nick Charles
 Myrna Loy as Nora Charles, Nick's wife
 Lucile Watson as Mrs. Charles, Nick's mother
 Gloria DeHaven as Laurabelle "Laura" Ronson
 Anne Revere as Crazy Mary
 Helen Vinson as Helena Draque
 Harry Davenport as Dr. Bertram Charles
 Leon Ames as Edgar Draque
 Donald Meek as Willie Crump
 Edward Brophy as Brogan; in the first film he played a character named Joe Morelli
 Lloyd Corrigan as Dr. Bruce Clayworth
 Anita Sharp-Bolster as Hilda (as Anita Bolster)
 Ralph Brooks as Peter Berton
 Donald MacBride as Police Chief MacGregor
 Morris Ankrum as Willoughby
 Nora Cecil as Miss Peavy
 Minor Watson as Sam Ronson

Notes
Production of a Thin Man film had been planned for 1942, but Myrna Loy refused the role because her attention was focused on her recent marriage to John D. Hertz, Jr. and her all-consuming War work for the Red Cross. Fans received the suggestion that Irene Dunne might take over the role of Nora with horror. TCM's Roger Fristoe quotes Powell recalling later: "The fans wanted Myrna, and they didn't want anyone else...And I wanted Myrna, too. Besides the favorable reception our pictures always received, I must say it was certainly a pleasure to work with her". Powell remembered the spectacular welcome Loy received on her first day back to a set thronged with well-wishers: "I've never seen a girl so popular with so many people... Everybody from wardrobe was over the set, everybody from makeup, everybody from property, everybody from miles around, it looked like".

The Thin Man Goes Home was Loy's only wartime picture.

The cocktail shaker, a staple prop from previous films in the series, ceased to be omnipresent in this one, replaced by a running gag about how difficult it is to get a drink in Nick’s hometown: Nick's faithful flask contains only cider. TCM's Notes on the film say that "according to an April 1944 Hollywood Reporter news item, wartime liquor rationing prompted producer Everett Riskin to eliminate the heavy drinking that had been an integral part of Nick and Nora's daily life in previous The Thin Man films".

The film was the fifth of six based on the characters of Nick and Nora:
 The Thin Man (1934)
 After the Thin Man (1936)
 Another Thin Man (1939)
 Shadow of the Thin Man (1941)
 The Thin Man Goes Home (1945)
 Song of the Thin Man (1947)

Box office
According to MGM records, the film earned $1,770,000 in the US and Canada, and $1,044,000 elsewhere resulting in a profit of $501,000.

References

The Eddie Mannix Ledger, Los Angeles: Margaret Herrick Library, Center for Motion Picture Study.

External links

 
 
 
 

1945 films
1945 crime films
1945 comedy films
1940s crime comedy films
1945 mystery films
American black-and-white films
American crime comedy films
American comedy thriller films
American detective films
American sequel films
1940s English-language films
Films directed by Richard Thorpe
Metro-Goldwyn-Mayer films
Films with screenplays by Robert Riskin
The Thin Man films
Films set in New England
1940s American films